The 2016 Women's Africa Cup Sevens was a women's rugby sevens tournament held in Harare, Zimbabwe on 17–18 September 2016.

Teams

Pool stage

Pool A

Pool B

Tournament Stage

7th Place

5th Place

Cup

Rankings

References

2016
2016 rugby sevens competitions
2016 in African rugby union
rugby union
International rugby union competitions hosted by Zimbabwe
2016 in women's rugby union
2016 in Zimbabwean women's sport